Gary Stroutsos (born July 19, 1954) is a flute player based in Seattle, Washington who plays a variety of genres of music. He has made his mark by tapping into the Native American canon, and has brought several forgotten songs to life. He plays a variety of different flutes from all around the world, and in unusual settings.

Stroutsos has played and collaborated with many recognized musicians. Danilo Lozano, Jonn Serrie, William Eaton, Glen Velez, David Lanz, James Newton, Poncho Sanchez and Michito Sanchez to name a few. He is of Greek-Italian descent.

Noted flute maker Vance Pennington has constructed a Gary Stroutsos signature version of the Xiao, a flute that Stroutsos has introduced to Native American music.

External links
Gary Stroutsos
[ Gary Stroutsos All Music Bio]

1954 births
Living people
American flautists